The mourning sierra finch (Rhopospina fruticeti) is a species of South American bird in the tanager family Thraupidae. It is the only member of the genus Rhopospina.

It is found in Argentina, Bolivia, Chile and Peru. It is a vagrant to the Falkland Islands and Brazil. Its natural habitats are subtropical or tropical dry shrubland and subtropical or tropical high-altitude shrubland.

Taxonomy
The mourning sierra finch was formally described and illustrated in 1883 by the German naturalist Heinrich von Kittlitz under the binomial name Fringilla fruticeti. This species was formerly included in the genus Phrygilus. A molecular phylogenetic study published in 2014 found that Phrygilus was polyphyletic, and in the subsequent rearrangement, the mourning sierra finch was moved to the resurrected genus Rhopospina that had been introduced in 1851 by Jean Cabanis. The genus name combines the Ancient Greek rhōps meaning "bush" with spina meaning "finch". The specific epithet is from the Latin fruticetum meaning "thicket".

Three subspecies are recognised:
 R. f. peruviana (Zimmer, JT, 1924) – Peru and west Bolivia
 R. f. coracina (Sclater, PL, 1891) – southwest Bolivia and northeast Chile
 R. f. fruticeti (Kittlitz, 1833) – north to south Chile and west Argentina

References

External links
Xeno-canto: audio recordings of the mourning sierra finch

mourning sierra finch
Birds of the Andes
Birds of Patagonia
mourning sierra finch
Taxonomy articles created by Polbot
Taxa named by Heinrich von Kittlitz